Events from the year 1662 in Sweden

Incumbents
 Monarch – Charles XI

Events
 The work on the new Drottningholm Palace is started
 The mourning period of the late monarch is terminated.
 Dueling is banned through the Duellplakatet
 Old Farmer's Almanac published in Swedish

Births
 Maria Aurora von Königsmarck, courtier, amateur actress, royal mistress and famous beauty (died 1728) 
 Beata Sparre, courtier and spy (died 1724) 
 Sofia Drake, landowner and letter writer  (died 1741)

Deaths

 Axel Lillie, soldier and politician (born 1603) 
 Elizabeth Ribbing, secret royal spouse (born 1596) 
 Ebba Sparre, courtier and favorite  (born 1629)

References

 
Years of the 17th century in Sweden
Sweden